Patlipada, previously a village in the Indian state of Maharashtra, is now a part of Thane city. It has a residential complex and the official residence of the Thane Municipal Commissioner.

Geography
Patlipada is located on the Ghodbunder Road which is 6–7 km from the Thane Railway Station. Originally, the village was mostly covered with agricultural fields. It has now been transformed into a town.

The area has seen massive population growth with a lot of new residential and commercial projects being completed in the last 4–8 years. Commercial activity is on the rise. Patlipada is at a higher altitude than the actual city. The Sanjay Gandhi National Park area is across the road. Coming from Thane Station, Patlipada is after Manpada and before Waghbil.

Being one of the important suburbs on the central side, the growth of Thane city can be credited to its growing residential, commercial, retail and infrastructure development. The small town of Thane now has huge complexes and new areas open for development like the Ghodbunder Road and Pokhran Road among others.

Demographics and culture
Patlipada area has a predominantly Maharashtrian culture although, like Thane City, it is cosmopolitan. Beside Marathi, sizable populations of North Indians, South Indians, Sindhis, Gujaratis and Marwari and other people from different regions live in Patlipada, mainly because of its proximity to Mumbai. Mumbai and Thane are separated only politically but the culture and customs are all the same. Festivals such as Ganesh Chaturthi, Navratri and Durga Puja are celebrated in this area.

Life

The size of the city has increased greatly in recent years, spurred on by a residential boom due to people moving away from Mumbai and Thane to find affordable homes and good amenities. The housing density is lower than the Thane City as the area is further from the railway station, but it is the most expensive area on Ghodbunder Road and one of the five most expensive places in Thane City.

The official residence of Thane Municipal Commissioner is in Patlipada. The development of upmarket residential complexes such as Hiranandani Estate, the Rutu Estate and Nisarg-Tapovan has increased the influx of people into this area. The area will have a number of malls, one of which is under construction.

The Hiranandani Estate area is well known for its many eateries, having a wide variety of restaurants, ice-cream parlours, cake shops, cafés and snack shops. The area also has an amusement park, Hakone.

Cine Wonder Mall and Lake City mall are near to the Patlipada area in Kapurbavadi and Majiwada respectively.

Transport

Thane Municipal Transport (TMT), Brihanmumbai Electric Supply and Transport (BEST), Mira-Bhayandar Municipal Transport (MBMT) and MSRTC (State Transport) corporations provide public bus service to the area. Autorickshaw on meter is available to travel within the city as well as normal taxis and A/c taxis.

Education
Patlipada has good schools offering education in English as well as vernacular medium. The English medium schools include  
Hiranandani Foundation School (Kindergarten to 12th standard with ICSE syllabus), Sri Ma Vidyalaya (Kindergarten to 12th with CBSE Syllabus).

The Reading Tree pre-primary school is located in the Hiranandani Estate.

The Marathi medium schools include Mazi Aai Shala.

There is also a State Board Junior college named Shubham Raje Junior College (S.R.J.C) which is usually the choice of the students who are preparing for the JEE Examination as attendance is not an issue.

Government offices
The official residence of Municipal Commissioner of Thane is located at Patlipada. MSEB also has an office in Patlipada.

Residential projects
 Hiranandani Estate
 The Rutu Estate
 Cosmos Classique
 Rutu Towers
 Nisarg Tapovan
 Nisarg Upavan
 Shree Sharanam
 Prakruti Park
 MSEB COLONY

Climate
As Thane City, Patlipada has a tropical climate, specifically a tropical wet and dry climate under the Köppen climate classification, with seven months of dryness and peak rainfall in July. The cold season from December to February is followed by the summer season from March to June. The period from June to about the end of September constitutes the south-west monsoon season, and October and November form the post-monsoon season. Between June and September, the south west monsoon rains lash the city. Pre-monsoon showers are received in May. Occasionally, north-east monsoon showers occur in October and November.

See also
 Thane
 Hiranandani Estate
 The Rutu Estate
 Kaasar Vadavali
 Waghbil
 Brahmand
 Pachpakhadi
 Thane Municipal Transport (TMT)
 Transportation in Thane

References

Neighbourhoods in Thane